Jinčov castle (also known as Jinčov castle) is a castle ruin in the municipality of Běleč in the Central Bohemian Region of the Czech Republic. It is protected as a cultural monument of the Czech Republic.

Location

History
Jenčov is one of the smallest castles in the Czech Republic, which likely served as a hunting castle. The exact date when the foundation of the castle was established is unknown. Research confirmed its existence at the turn of the 13th and 14th centuries and was likely founded by Ottokar II of Bohemia.

Jenčov was the smallest royal castle in the kingdom. Due to the distance to the nearest villages, the ruin of the castle was not dismantled into building material and has been preserved.

Gallery

See also
List of castles in the Czech Republic
History of the Czech lands in the Middle Ages

References

External links

The Jenčov Castle Association

Castles in the Central Bohemian Region
Kladno District
Gothic architecture in the Czech Republic